The Altenberg is a hill in Hesse, Germany. It is next to the L3053 road.

History 
In 1323 Hohensolms Castle on the Altenberg was mentioned for the first time. It secured the interests of the Counts of Solms-Burgsolms and Solms-Braunfels in the northern part of their county against the Landgrave of Hesse and the Solms-Königsberg line allied with him. The complex was destroyed twice during armed conflicts, in which the imperial city Wetzlar was also involved. After the destruction in 1349, the site was abandoned by imperial order, and the castle was moved to the neighbouring Ramsberg, where it still stands today.

Observation tower 
Prince Ferdinand of Solms-Hohensolms-Lich had his seat in the 1830s at the nearby castle Hohensolms, which is about 5m and can still be climbed today. In good weather, it generally offers a distant view from the Wetterau in the south to the Taunus in the southwest, the Westerwald in the west to the Schelderwald. in the northwest. To the north or east, one could see Hohensolms Castle and the Dünsberg. However, the view is now so limited by the regrowth of the surrounding trees that all around you can see only the forest. Nevertheless, the summit area with its special atmosphere and resting places is a worthwhile destination for hikers.

 Hills of Hesse
 Hills of the Gladenbach Uplands